Erna Villmer (also Willmer; 1 March 1889 Tallinn – 16 June 1965 Tallinn) was an Estonian actress.

Early life 
Erna Villmer was born in 1889 on February 17 in Tallinn. Father Juhan Villmer was from Paldisk, mother Anette Krusbach was from Tallinn.  At the age of 7, she started attending the High School for Girls in the city.

The first personal gaming experience, or the explosion of inspiration that Erna Villmer later remembers, was born in a German language class, when she had to read a poem. Something in her voice, expression or gesture deserved the admiration of the whole class and the teacher made a complimentary comment. After that remark from the teacher, she admitted to his mother that she wanted to become an actor. The mother then said that an actor must have a beautiful face and first of all a beautiful figure. The profession of an actor was then considered extremely inappropriate.

1907-1910 she studied at Moscow Art Theatre, but she didn't finish the school.

(1910-1914) First roles and gameplay 
From 1910 until 1914 she worked at Estonia Theatre.
Villmeri was seen as a talent, a new star in the Estonian troupe, she developed into a leading actress alongside Paul Pinna and Altermann. Reviewers appreciated his novel acting style - subtle, psychological portrayal of parts, inner acting technique, they enjoyed the elaborateness of the roles, the ability to draw out details, but the viewers were most moved by her soulful and emotionally natural acting. A separate theme in Villmeri's acting is her oversensitivity and emotionality, which at the best moment gave powerful internal charges to an outwardly meager performance, but in the worst cases turned into a "watery" emotional play - there was no acting and the actress disappeared in a flood of emotions. Villmer considered it a shortcoming that she couldn't laugh on stage, her nature lacked joy, which was caused by the poverty of joy from her childhood.
In 1913, she married psychiatrist, politician and cultural figure Juhan Luiga. The couple had no children and divorced in 1923.

First World War 
At the beginning of the war, on August 14, 1914, the Estonian Society canceled the contract with the actors and disbanded the entire cast. The Russian government took the theater house from the society in order to bring a military hospital there from Libya. After a great demand, the governor gave in and the Estonian theater could start the second season in its new building during the Great War. The first war season was both a year of overcoming difficulties and losses for the troupe. In the second year of the war, Erna Villmer lived in Finland with her husband, until Lui was sent to Kuramae to the Dune front in the fall of 1916. Villmer then moved back to Tallinn and started working again in Estonia. During the war, the audience demanded more jokes, pranks, operettas that would make them forget the pressure of war for a few hours. Despite the difficulties, the theater remained in operation - a great victory for the troupe, the theater, and Estonian culture in general. If the actors had not taken up the matter so energetically, the Estonian Theater would have remained closed for years.

1920s 
The 1920s could be called the peak period of Villmeri's work. She played a lot and well, critics praised her, she was called the most talented, most loved, most intelligent actress of the Estonian theater. The breadth of her scope, alongside the former young girls and gentle maidens, have come deep, dramatic women, as well as coquettes and big ladies. At that time, an extremely close collaboration with actor and director Ants Lauter was also born, together Estonian theater was brought to the height of art - a business-loving entertainment institution was becoming a professional theater. At the end of September 1923, Villmer traveled to Europe with Lauter. Marital relations with Lui were strained to the extreme, the "romance" with Lauter had matured, and the situation demanded a solution. In the same stage of her life are also his increasingly severe attacks: extremely strong headaches. In 1925, Villmer had an operation for a uterine tumor, at that time she was sidelined from theater life.

In 1928, Villmer married Ants Lauter.

1930s until her death 
In the 1930s, they still played with Lauter, at least once every season, and Villmer played in Lauter's productions, but not in all of them anymore, and not in the lead roles either. After all, Lauter had become a drama director and she had to draw a strict line between theater and personal interests. To think more about the work of the entire theater than about herself and her actress husband, who was undoubtedly one of Estonia's best stage forces, but still with one disadvantage - the husband of a drama director. Cooperation could also be hindered by Villmer's disease, constant severe headaches.

The amount of work kept decreasing, the presumed cause of which was her illness. In 1937, her last year of work, Villmer played in only two productions. Her last role on the Estonian stage was in Fanny's play "Caesar". At the end of 1937, Villmer fell ill and was forced to stop working in the theater. Unfortunately, the time spent in a sanatorium in Germany was of no use, so she went to a sanatorium in Finland with the help of financial support. However, the disease progressed irreversibly, the paralysis worsened. Soon she needed a wheelchair, a carer, and it was difficult to understand her speech. Erna Villmer died on June 16, 1965.

Awards 
 1935: Merited Actor of Estonia

Theatre roles

1910
 Klärchen – H. Sudermann, "Soodoma hukatus" (lavastaja T. Altermann)
 Marthel – G. Hauptmann, "Rose Bernd" (lavastaja K. Jungholz)
 Effie – L.Thoma, "Moraal" (lavastaja teadmata)
 Ester – G. Wied, "2x2=5"
 Kati – J. Kunder, "Mulgi mõistus ja tartlase tarkus"
 Delfine – H. Bahr, "Kontsert" (lavastaja T. Altermann)
 Nora – H. Ibsen, "Nora" (lavastaja K. Jungholz)

1911

 Paula – G. Laufs, W. Jacoby, "Kullakoobas" (lavastaja T. Altermann)
 Roosi – H. Sudermann, "Liblikate lahing"
 Sonja – A. Tšehhov, "Onu Vanja"
 Mizzi – F. Molnar, "Kurat" (lavastaja Paul Pinna)
 Sigune – L. Fulda, "Salakuningas" (lavastaja T. Altermann)
 Dina Dorf – H. Ibsen, "Seltskonna toed" (lavastaja K. Jungholz)
 Olga – L. Andrejev, "Meie elupäevad" (lavastaja T. Altermann)
 Elina – M. Jotuni, "Vana kodu" (lavastaja E. Virgo)
 Tundmatu osa – L. Fulda, " Lollpea" (lavastaja T. Altermann)
 Cordelia – W. Shakespeare, "Kuningas Lear" (lavastaja K. Jungholz)
 Kamilla – G. Esmann, "Isad ja poeg"
 Signe – B. Bjornson, "Pankrot" (lavastaja K. Jungholz)
 Anna Danby – A. Dumas, "Kean" (lavastaja K. Jungholz)
 Leena – A. Kitzberg, "Tuulte pöörises" (lavastaja K. Jungholz)

1912

 Lidotška – A. Suhhovo-Kobõlin, "Kretšinski pulm."
 Hedwig – H. Ibsen, "Metspart" (lavastaja K. Jungholz)
 Ruth – O. Ernst, "Armastus ei väsi iial ära"
 Nimetu kõrvalosa – V. Gonsiorevski, I. Nikirovitš, "Napoleon ja pani Walewska"(lavastaja Paul Pinna)
 Klaara – F. Wedekind, "Kuningas Nicolo" (lavastaja K. Jungholz)
 Melide – H. Sudermann, "Rannalapsed" (lavastaja K. Jungholz)
 Saša – L. Tolstoi, "Elav laip" (lavastaja Paul Pinna)
 Klärchen – J. W. Goethe, "Egmont" (lavastaja K. Jungholz)
 Käthe – L. Fulda, "Naisori" (lavastaja H. Rantanen)
 Helena – A. Bisson, "Tundmatu naisterahvas" (lavastaja H. Rantanen)
 Elly – C. Rutoff, "Kivi" (lavastaja K. Jungholz)
 Anna – H. Bahr, "Lapsed" (lavastaja K. Jungholz)

1913

 Else – M. Dreyer, "Armu unenäod"
 Helene – B. Bjornson, "Kui noored viinapuud õitsevad" (lavastaja Karl Jungholz)
 Marie – H. Sudermnn, "Kodu" (lavastaja K. Jungholz)
 Marianne – H. Wuolijoki, "Talulapsed" (lavastaja K. Jungholz)
 Ophelia – W. Shakespeare, "Hamlet" (lavastaja K. Jungholz)
 Anna – C. R. Jakobson, "Arthur ja Anna" (lavastaja T. Altermann)
 Olga – L. Andrejev, "Meie elupäevad" (lavastaja T. Altermann)
 Eeva Marland – E. Vilde, "Tabamata ime" (lavastaja K. Jungholz)
 Irene – G. Dregely, "Hästiõmmeldud sabakuub" (lavastaja K. Jungholz)
 Rautendelein – G. Hauptmann, "Põhjavajunud kell" (lavastaja K. Jungholz)

1914

 Charlotte – C. Rössler, "Viis frankfurtlast" ( Lavastaja T. Altermann)
 Thea Elvsted – H. Ibsen, "Hedda Gabler" (lavastaja K. Jungholz)
 Antonida – A. Gorodetski "Elu tsaari eest" (lavastaja T. Altermann)
 Laura – E. Vilde, "Pisuhänd" (lavastaja T. Altermann)
 Maria – A. Needra, "Maa" (lavastaja K. Jungholz)
 Elga – G. Hauptmann, "Elga" (lavastaja T. Altermann)
 Selma – G. Malahov, O. Elsner, "Naistetundja" (lavastaja T. Altermann)
 Daniela – G. Okonkovski, "Kosjaturg" (lavastaja T. Altermann)
 Maria – K. Polonejev, "Kuristik" (lavastaja T. Altermann)
 Else – R. Presber, "Venus Anadyomene" (lavastaja T.Altermann)

1915

 Niina Korinkina – A. Ostrovski, "Süüta süüdlased" (lavastaja T. Altermann)
 Agafja – N. Gogol, "Kosjad" (lavastaja T. Altermann)
 Helene Heyer – R. Johnson Young, "Kuidas meest saab" (lavastaja A. Sällik)
 Maimu – Aspasia, "Kaotatud õigused" (lavastaja A. Sällik)
 Cecily – O. Wilde, "Bunbury" (lavastaja T. Altermann)
 Maali – A. Teodorov, "Elunälg" (lavastaja Paul Pinna)
 Hilda – O. Walther, "Ohvritall" (lavastaja A. Sällik)
 Teenija Stasia – J. K. Jerome, "Võõras" (lavastaja H. Vellner)

1916

 Grace – H. Bataille, "Pulmamarss" (lavastaja K. Jungholz)

1917

 Laura – E. Vilde, "Pisuhänd" (lavastaja K. Jungholz)
 Ellida – H. Ibseni, "Naine merelt" (lavastaja K. Jungholz)
 Mary – A. Sandberg, "Puuvilla kuningas" (lavastaja P. Pinna)
 Maie – L. Koidula, "Säärane mulk" (lavastaja K. Jungholz)

1918

 Dina Dorf – H. Ibseni, "Seltskonna toed" (lavastaja K. Jungholz)
 Irene – H. Dregely, "Hästiõmmeldud sabakuub" (lavastaja K. Jungholz)
 Helene – A. Bisson, "Tundmatu naisterahvas" (lavastaja K. Jungholz)
 Klara – B. Bjornson, "Üle jõu" (lavastaja K. Jungholz)
 Ruth – J. Galsworthy, "Justiits" (lavastaja K. Jungholz)
 Maria Antonovna – N. Gogol, "Revident" (lavastaja A. Lauter)
 Niina Korinkina – N. Ostrovski, "Süüta süüdlased" (lavastaja A. Lauter)

1919

 Maria – W. Schmidtbonn, "Appi! Laps kukkus taevast" (lavastaja K. Jungholz)
 Tundmatu osa – C. Rössler, L. Heller, "Tugitoolis"(lavastaja A. Lauter)
 Alma – H. Sudermann, "Au" (lavastaja K. Jungholz)
 Maria – A. Needra, "Maa" (lavastaja K. Jungholz)
 Hermia – W. Shakespeare, "Suveöö unenägu" (lavastaja K. Jungholz)
 Anja – A. Tšehhov, "Kirsiaed" (lavastaja A. Lauter)
 Lola – H. Sudermann, "Ülem elu" (lavastaja A. Lauter)
 Melisande – M. Maeterlinck, "Pelleas ja Melisande" (lavastaja E. Villmer)
 Trude Meyer – C. Viebig, "Võitlus mehe pärast" (lavastaja K. Jungholz)

1920

 Pero – W. Schmidtbonn, "Mängiv Eros" (lavastaja K. Jungholz)
 Rita Cavallini – E. Sheldon, "Romaan" (lavastaja A. Lauter)
 Ruth – M. Glass, "Potaš ja perlmutter" (lavastaja A. Lauter)
 Miss Mabel – O. Wilde, "Ideaalne abielumees" (lavastaja B. Kuuskemaa)
 Lygia – H. Sienkiewicz, N. Sabolštšikov-Samarin, "Quo vadis?" (lavastaja A. Lauter)

1921

 Alaine – S. Michaelis, "Revolutsiooni pulm" (lavastaja A. Lauter)
 Pauline Paola – A. Schnitzler, "Naine pistodaga" (lavastaja H. Kompus)
 Kolombiina – R. Lothar, "Kuningas Arlekiin" (lavastaja H. Kompus)
 Eeva – G. Moser, "Raamatukoguhoidja" (lavastaja A. Lauter)
 Berta – F. Schiller, "Willhelm Tell" (lavastaja K. Jungholz)
 Suzanne – Beaumarchais, "Figaro pulm" (lavastaja A. Lauter)
 Lady Waynflete – B. Shaw, "Kapten Brassboundi ärkamine" (lavastaja H. Kompus)
 Margot – H. Devere, " Navarra Henrik" (lavastaja A. Lauter)
 Myrrhina – Aristophanes, "Lysistrata" (lavastaja E. Villmer)

1922

 Therese – S. Vardi, "Dekoratsioon" (lavastaja H. Kompus)
 Mustlanna Sanda – L. Ganghofer, M. Brociner, "Waleni pulm" (lavastaja A. Lauter)
 Marie Claire – P. Frondaie, "Montmartre" (lavastaja H. Kompus)
 Paula – F. Schönthan, "Sabiini naiste röövimine" (lavastaja A. Lauter)
 Elma – J. H. Talomaa, "Igavene elu" (lavastaja K. Jungholz)
 Fatme – L. Kitzberg-Pappel, "Fatme" (lavastaja E. Villmer)
 Consuela – L. Andrejev, "Too, kes saab kõrvahoope" (lavastaja A. Lauter)

1923

 Helene – A. de Caillavet, R. de Flers, G. Rey, "Võrratu avantüür" (lavastaja A. Lauter)
 Ophelia – W. Shakespeare, "Hamlet" (lavastaja K. Jungholz)
 Irene – H. Dregely, "Hästiõmmeldud sabakuub" (lavastaja K. Jungholz)

1924

 Desdemona – W. Shakespeare, "Othello" (lavastaja A. Lauter)
 Alexandra – F. Molnar, "Luik" (lavastaja A. Lauter)
 Juudit – A. H. Tammsaare, "Juudit" (lavastaja A. Lauter)
 Jeanette Diele – T. Rittner, "Hundid ööl" (lavastaja A. Lauter)

1925

 Agatha – J. M. Barrie, "Imetlusväärne Chrichton" (lavastaja A. Lauter)
 Irja Sormuinen – E. Leino, "Simo Hurt" (lavastaja H. Kompus)
 Eeva Marland – E. Vilde "Tabamata ime" (lavastaja K. Jungholz)
 Gabriela – S. Garrick, "Daam lahutuspõhjusega" (lavastaja Ants Lauter)
 Camila – P. Merimee, "Viimse jumalaarmu tõld" (lavastaja A. Lauter)
 Clara Urcino – L. Lunz, "Lindprii" (lavastaja A. Lauter)
 Mima – F. Molnar, "Punane veski" (lavastaja A. Lauter)
 Henriette – A. Strindberg, "Patt" (lavastaja P. Sepp)

1926

 Nadja – C. Goetz, "Muinasjutt" (lavastaja H. Laur)
 Delila – H. Raudsepp, "Kohtumõistja Simson" (lavastaja P. Sepp)
 Lotte – F. Arnold, E. Bach, "Vana Aadam" (lavastaja A. Lauter)
 Portia – W. Shakespeare, "Veneetsia kaupmees" (lavastaja P. Sepp)
 Tschng-Haitang – G. Klabund, "Kriidiring" (lavastaja P. Sepp)

1927

 Simone – J. Deval, "Oma naiivses puhtuses" (lavastaja P. Sepp)
 Roxane – E. de Rostand, "Cyrano de bergerac" (lavastaja P. Sepp)
 Lucrezia – C. Goldoni, "Smürna impressario" (lavastaja H. Gleser)
 Solveig – H. Ibsen, "Peer Gynt" (lavastaja P. Sepp)
 Melita – F. Grillparzer, "Sappho" (lavastaja A. Lauter)

1928

 Fanny – J. K. Jerome, "Fanny ja ta teenijad" (lavastaja P. Sepp)
 Rosalind – W. Shakespeare, "Armu- ja narrimäng" ("Nagu teile meeldib") (lavastaja A. Lauter)
 Leonore – F. Schiller, "Fiesco" (lavastaja P. Sepp)
 Lia Kampus – W. Hasenclever, "Peenem härra" (lavastaja A. Lauter)
 Anna Ostermann – A. Neumann, "Patrioot" (lavastaja A. Lauter)

1929

 Susy Courtois – M. Pagnol, "Elu aabits" (lavastaja P. Pinna)
 Eerika – M. Metsanurk, "Talupoja poeg" (lavastaja H. Kompus)

1930

 Susi – L. Fodor, "Vaene kui kirikurott" (lavastaja H. Paris)
 Kreosa –F. Grillparzer, "Medea" (lavastaja H. Gleser)
 Leslie – W. Somerset-Maugham, "Kiri" (lavastaja H. Paris)

1931

 Kirjaneitsi – A. Adson, "Lauluisa ja Kirjaneitsi" (lavastaja H. Kompus)
 Viktoria – B. Frank, " Torm veeklaasis" (lavastaja H. Paris)
 Germaine – S. Verneuil, "Saatan" (lavastaja E. Villmer)
 Halastajaõde – J. Galswothy, "Tuli" (lavastaja A. Lauter)
 Mare – A. Adson, "Neli kuningat" (lavastaja A. Lauter)
 Lu – F. Molnar, "Õnnehaldjas" (lavastaja H. Paris)

1932

 Anna – F. Langer, "Agul" (lavastaja H. Gleser)
 Koidula – H. Wuolijoki, "Koidula" (lavastaja A. Lauter)

1933

 Myra – C. Sherwood, "Waterloo sild" (lavastaja A. Sikemäe)
 Lilian – F. Cammerlohr, E. Ebermayer, "Sularaha" (lavastaja H. Kompus)
 Rita – S. Geyer, P. Frank, "Suhkur ja sool" (lavastaja P. Põldroos)

1934

 Melisande – H. Raudsepp, "Roosad prillid" (lavastaja A. Lauter)

1935

 Ellen Jones – S. Tradewell, "Mašinaal", külalisena Tallinna Töölisteatris (lavastaja Priit Põldroos)
 Ludmilla Jool – K. A. Hindrey, "Raidaru kirikumõis" (lavastaja H. Kompus)
 Rita Dina – F. Buch, "Kuivatage silmavett" (lavastaja P. Põldroos)
 Olivia – W. Shkespeare, "Mida soovite" ("Kaheteistkümnes öö") (lavastaja P. Põldroos)
 Jacqueline – E. Bourdet, "Äsja ilmunud" (lavastaja P. Põldroos)

1936

 Alice Galvoisier – J. Deval, "Preili" (lavastaja A. Lauter)
 Surm ja Bessie Legros – W. Somerset-Maugham, "Peavõit" (lavastaja A. Lauter)

1937

 Portia – W. Shakespeare. "Veneetsia kaupmees" (lavastaja P. Põldroos)
 Titania – W. Shakespeare, "Suveöö unenägu" (lavastaja A. Lauter)
 Ellen – H. Raudsepp, "Mees, kelle käes on trumbid" (lavastaja A. Lauter)
 Fanny – : Pagnol, "Tseesar" (lavastaja P. Põldroos)

References

1889 births
1965 deaths
Estonian stage actresses
Estonian musical theatre actresses
20th-century Estonian actresses
Actresses from Tallinn